The 2014 UTSA Roadrunners football team represented the University of Texas at San Antonio in the 2014 NCAA Division I FBS football season. This was the fourth season for football at UTSA and their second as members of Conference USA in the West Division. Larry Coker returned as the team's head coach for a fourth season. The Roadrunners played their home games at the Alamodome. They finished the season 4–8, 3–5 in C-USA play to finish in fourth place in the West Division.

Personnel

Coaching staff

Schedule

Schedule Source:

Roster

Depth chart

Game summaries

Houston

 Source:

Arizona

 Source:

Oklahoma State

 Source:

Florida Atlantic

 Source:

New Mexico

FIU

Louisiana Tech

UTEP

Rice

Southern Miss

Western Kentucky

North Texas

References

UTSA
UTSA Roadrunners football seasons
UTSA Roadrunners football